Chondrostoma orientale is a species of ray-finned fish in the genus Chondrostoma which is endemic to Iran.

References 

 

Chondrostoma
Fish described in 1982
Taxa named by Petre Mihai Bănărescu